Family Film is a 2015 Czech drama adventure film by Slovenian director Olmo Omerzu. The story is about teenagers whose parents go on vacation and leave them at home. The film also follows the family's dog Otto who is lost on a deserted island and tries to survive. The film was shot in Prague and Thailand.

Family Film won two Czech Film Critics' Awards. It was awarded in categories Best film and Best Screenplay.

Cast
 Karel Roden as Igor, Father of Erik and Anna.
 Vanda Hybnerová as Irena, Mother of Erik and Anna.
 Daniel Kadlec as Erik
 Jenovéfa Boková as Anna, Erik's sister.
 Martin Pechlát as Martin, Igor's brother.
 Eliška Křenková as Kristína, Anna's friend who starts a sexual relationship with Erik.
 Miroslav Sabadin as Tomáš
 Vojtěch Záveský as Robert
 Jaroslav Plesl as Male doctor
 Jana Krausová as headmistress Pernerová

References

2015 films
2010s adventure drama films
Czech adventure drama films
2010s Czech-language films
Films set in Prague
Films shot in Thailand
Golden Kingfisher winners
Czech Film Critics' Awards winners
Films about siblings